The 2012 Singapore Cup (known as the RHB Singapore Cup for sponsorship reasons) starts in May 2012. It is the 15th staging of the annual Singapore Cup tournament.

11 S.League clubs and 4 invited foreign teams play in this edition. The cup was a single-elimination tournament, with all sixteen teams playing from the first round. The first round involved one-off matches. Subsequent rounds involved ties of two legs.

The Courts Young Lions and Malaysia's Harimau Muda, both of whom are Great Eastern-YEO'S S.League participant teams, have requested and received permission to sit out of the RHB Singapore Cup, due to their respective preparations for the AFC Under-22 Asian Cup qualifiers in June.

The first round kicked off on 14 May 2012.
The quarter-finals will be held from 2 to 9 July 2012. The finals will be held at Jalan Besar Stadium on 28 October 2012

The cup winner qualified for the 2013 AFC Cup.

Teams
S.League Clubs
  Albirex Niigata (S)
 Balestier Khalsa
  DPMM FC
 Geylang United
 Gombak United
 Home United
 Hougang United
 Singapore Armed Forces (SAFFC)
 Tampines Rovers
 Tanjong Pagar United
 Woodlands Wellington

Invited Foreign Teams
  Phnom Penh Crown
  Yotha FC
  Harimau Muda B
  Kanbawza FC
  Loyola Meralco Sparks

Knockout bracket

Preliminary round
All times are Singapore Standard Time (SST) – UTC+8.

Quarter-finals
All times are Singapore Standard Time (SST) – UTC+8.

First leg

Second leg

Semi-finals
All times are Singapore Standard Time (SST) – UTC+8.

First leg

Second leg

Third-place Playoff
All times are Singapore Standard Time (SST) – UTC+8.

Final
All times are Singapore Standard Time (SST) – UTC+8.

References

External links
 Official S.League website
 Football Association of Singapore website

2012
2012 domestic association football cups
Cup